A British dance, descended from the jazz dances of the 1930s and 1940s jive and ultimately from the Lindy Hop. Danced to trad jazz music, was popular in England in the 1950s and 1960s in jazz clubs in London; notably Jazzshows (now the 100 Club, 100 Oxford St) and the Ken Colyer club (Studio 51 Gt Newport St. now closed). There were also jazz club events at most large towns, especially in the south of England (e.g. Guildford Surrey, Farnborough Hants, Bexley Kent) where trad jazz enthusiasts congregated and would "skip jive" all evening. It is still danced to a limited extent today.

See also 
 Wikibooks: Swing Dancing
 http://www.howtojive.com/intro-skip-jive.htm

Swing dances